J34 may refer to:
 Hawker J 34 Hunter, a British fighter jet in service with the Swedish Air Force
 LNER Class J34, a British steam locomotive class
 Malaysia Federal Route J34
 Pentagonal orthobirotunda (J34), a Johnson solid
 Westinghouse J34, an American turbojet engine